Magnetic dipole–dipole interaction, also called dipolar coupling, refers to the direct interaction between two magnetic dipoles.

The potential energy  of the interaction is then given by:

Last term with -function vanishes everywhere but the origin, and is necessary to ensure that  vanishes everywhere. Then:

where  is a unit vector in the direction of the line joining the two spins, and || is the distance between them.

Finally, the interaction energy can be expressed as the dot product of the moment of either dipole into the field from the other dipole:

It is not the sum of these terms.

 

The Fourier transform of  can be calculated from the fact that 

and is given by

Dipolar coupling and NMR spectroscopy 
The direct dipole-dipole coupling is very useful for molecular structural studies, since it depends only on known physical constants and the inverse cube of internuclear distance. Estimation of this coupling provides a direct spectroscopic route to the distance between nuclei and hence the geometrical form of the molecule, or additionally also on intermolecular distances in the solid state leading to NMR crystallography notably in amorphous materials.

For example, in water, NMR spectra of hydrogen atoms of water molecules are narrow lines because dipole coupling is averaged due to chaotic molecular motion. In solids, where water molecules are fixed in their positions and do not participate in the diffusion mobility, the corresponding NMR spectra have the form of the Pake doublet. In solids with vacant positions, dipole coupling is averaged partially due to water diffusion which proceeds according to the symmetry of the solids  and the probability distribution of molecules between the vacancies. 

Although internuclear magnetic dipole couplings contain a great deal of structural information, in isotropic solution, they average to zero as a result of  diffusion. However, their effect on nuclear spin relaxation results in measurable nuclear Overhauser effects (NOEs).

The residual dipolar coupling (RDC) occurs if the molecules in solution exhibit a partial alignment leading to an incomplete averaging of spatially anisotropic magnetic interactions i.e. dipolar couplings. RDC measurement provides information on the global folding of the protein-long distance structural information. It also provides information about "slow" dynamics in molecules.

See also 
J-coupling
Magic angle
Residual dipolar coupling
Nuclear Overhauser effect
Magnetic moment
Zero field splitting

References
Malcolm H. Levitt, Spin Dynamics: Basics of Nuclear Magnetic Resonance. .

Electromagnetism
Magnetic moment
Nuclear magnetic resonance